Cupcake Wars is an American reality competition series that premiered on December 27, 2009, on cable television network Food Network. The show, which is based on creating unique and professional-style cupcakes, was hosted by Justin Willman and later hosted by Jonathan Bennett.

The show is similar to Chopped, a cooking show aired on the same network, in that it starts with four contestants who are eliminated one-by-one during three rounds, with the winning team receiving $10,000 and the opportunity to be featured in an upcoming event. Each team consists of a chef and a sous-chef.

Rounds 
Each round takes about a third of the completed episode.

The first round lasts 45 minutes in competition and is focused around taste. Contestants must create a cupcake with unusual ingredients related to a theme – for example, a date-night theme might require contestants to incorporate various aphrodisiacs, such as oysters, basil, dark chocolate, or champagne.

The second round lasts 75 minutes in competition and is based on both taste and presentation. Contestants must make three different types of cupcakes of their own choice with a unique presentation that relates to the theme.

The third and final round is the most challenging, where the remaining two teams make 1,000 cupcakes in two hours. Each team must feature improved versions of the four cupcakes they made in the first two rounds and must showcase them on an elaborately constructed display. Both the cupcakes and the display must remain consistent with the episode's theme. Each team receives the assistance of four baking assistants and one carpenter in completing the round. This is the only round that the judges do not taste the cupcakes at the judge's table, and instead, the judges taste them at the display.

Themes 
The show invites cupcake bakers from all over the United States to compete. Each episode is centered on a theme or event; past themes include a Seaworld birthday party for an orca, a "match-making" aphrodisiac party, an Ace of Cakes 100th episode celebration, "Survival of the Fittest" theme, an autism charity event, a golf tournament, and a film festival.

Judges 
There are three judges in the series, with two of them serving as permanent judges:
 Candace Nelson, founder of Sprinkles Cupcakes, the world's first cupcake bakery (in episode 7 of season 7, Bobbie Lloyd, Chief Baking Officer of Magnolia Bakery filled in for Nelson)
 Florian Bellanger, executive French pastry chef
 The third, rotating judge, is a special guest and is associated with the event in which that episode's winning cupcakes are to be served.

Nelson and Bellanger usually give the bakers technical critiques on the methods, amounts, and ingredients they use, while the guest judges' critiques are usually much more subjective, based on whether or not they liked the cupcakes.

Episodes

See also
 Cake Wars

References

External links 

 
 
 
  Spinoff.

2000s American cooking television series
2010s American cooking television series
2000s American reality television series
2010s American reality television series
2009 American television series debuts
2018 American television series endings
Food reality television series
Food Network original programming
Cooking competitions in the United States
Reality competition television series